The following highways are numbered 223:

Canada
 Nova Scotia Route 223
 Prince Edward Island Route 223
 Quebec Route 223

China
 China National Highway 223

Costa Rica
 National Route 223

Japan
 Japan National Route 223

United States
 U.S. Route 223
 Alabama State Route 223
 California State Route 223
 Georgia State Route 223
 K-223 (Kansas highway)
Kentucky Route 223
 Maine State Route 223
 Maryland Route 223
 Minnesota State Highway 223
 Montana Secondary Highway 223
 Nevada State Route 223
 New Mexico State Road 223
 New York State Route 223
Ohio State Route 223 (former)
 Oregon Route 223
 Pennsylvania Route 223 (former)
 South Carolina Highway 223
 Tennessee State Route 223 
 Texas State Highway 223
 Utah State Route 223 (former)
 Virginia State Route 223
 Washington State Route 223
 Wyoming Highway 223